"Mess Around" is a song by American rock band Cage the Elephant. It was produced by Dan Auerbach of the Black Keys and was released as the lead single from the band's fourth studio album Tell Me I'm Pretty on October 29, 2015. It topped the Billboard Alternative Songs chart in the United States, becoming the band's sixth overall chart-topper. In 2016, it was featured in Acura's Summer of Performance Event TV spot, "Weekends: RDX".

Music video
The official music video for "Mess Around" was released on October 29, 2015. The video consists of footage from films by French filmmaker Georges Méliès, including A Trip to the Moon and The Impossible Voyage.

Charts

Weekly charts

Year-end charts

Certifications

Release history

References

2015 songs
2015 singles
Cage the Elephant songs
RCA Records singles
Song recordings produced by Dan Auerbach
Songs written by Matt Shultz (singer)